Nikita Sergeyevich Imullin (born 7 June 1995) is a Russian football midfielder. He plays for FC Avangard Kursk.

Club career
He made his debut in the Russian Second Division for FC Lada-Togliatti on 18 April 2013 in a game against FC Oktan Perm.

He made his Russian Football National League debut for FC Sokol Saratov on 19 July 2014 in a game against FC Luch-Energiya Vladivostok.

References

External links
 Career summary by sportbox.ru

1995 births
Sportspeople from Tolyatti
Living people
Russian footballers
Russia youth international footballers
Association football midfielders
FC Lada-Tolyatti players
FC Sokol Saratov players
FC Avangard Kursk players
FC Dynamo Bryansk players
FC Zenit-Izhevsk players
FC Volga Ulyanovsk players